Jawshan Kabeer ("the Great Cuirass") is a long Islamic prayer that contains 1001 names and attributes of God, and is widely used in many Shia Muslim traditions, especially in Turkey. Jawshan means "steel plate" or "mail" and thus the name of the prayer refers to Muhammad’s heavy armor in battle. According to Muslims, God taught the prayer to him as a protection from injuries in war, instead of hard armor.

History 
The Islamic prophet Mohammed used hard and heavy armor during fighting in the war. Because of the tightness of his armor, his body was injured. According to Muslims, during the war, the angel Jibra'il (Gabriel) came and brought him a message from God, teaching prayer to Muhammad to protect him from bad events. Jibra'il said: "O’ Muhammad! Your God conveys his salutations to you and has said to take this coat of armor and to recite it as this is a protection for you and your Ummah." The prayer became his armor to protect him against injuries. The name of the prayer was taken from Muhammad’s heavy armor, called Jawshan, in the battle.

Text 
The context of the prayer was written by Ali ibn Husayn Zayn al-Abidin and came to him from his great grandfather Muhammad by word of mouth. Afterwards, a narrator and faqih of Shia Islam, Ibrahim ibn Ali A’meli Kafa’mi, mentioned the Jawshan Kabir context in book Balad al-Amin.

The Jawshan Kabir prayer contains 100 parts. 25 of these parts start with I entreat You by Your Name. Names of God are recited after the phrase. In all, the supplication comprises 250 names of Allah and 750 attributes of Allah and request from Allah. For this reason, the Jawshan Kabir prayer is known as Ism-e-A’ẓam, i.e., the greatest name (of God). A same phrase is repeated at the end of each part. The meaning of this sentence is "Praise be to Thee, there is no God but Thee, The Granter of all Succor (Mercy!, Mercy!), Protect us from the Fire, O Lord."

List of mentioned names and attributes of Allah

Descriptions 
Sunni and Shiite scholars have written commentaries on the prayer of Jowshan Kabir. The most famous commentary is the commentary of Mullah Hadi Sabzevari. This description is partly mystical and philosophical . Sabzevari has testified to Persian and Arabic poems based on prayer verses and has referred to Firoozabadi's dictionary of lexicon for lexical issues. He has also raised philosophical, mystical, and theological issues on a variety of occasions

Recitation 
Muslims often read the Jawshan kabir in Laylat al-Qadr in Ramadan but some Hadiths recommend reading it at the beginning of Ramadan. Imam Ali said to his son, Husayn ibn Ali, to memorize and write this supplication on his kafan (burial shroud). Also, there are several hadiths from the prophet Muhammad that state that whoever recites this prayer will receive rewards in the world and Akhirah. Abbas Qumi wrote the prayer in his book Mafatih al-Janan.

Writing 
According to the book of Urwath al-Wutha of Mohammed Kazem Yazdi, writing Dua Jawshan Kabir (as well as writing the whole of Quran and Du'a Jawshan Sagheer) on the shroud is deemed as a Mustahabb practice; it has also been mentioned through Husayn ibn Ali that it is permissible to write Jawshan Kabir and Jawshan Sagheer on the shroud, but, in order not to be Najis, it is better not to write on the parallel or lower of Awrah.

See also 

 Jawshan Sagheer
 Du'a Nudba
 Du'a al-Faraj
 Ramadan
 Du'a al-Baha
 Supplication of Abu Hamza al-Thumali
 Mujeer Du'a
 Dua Ahd

References

External Links 

 Read and Download PDF

Shia prayers
Salah terminology
Islamic terminology
Ramadan